Rachid Belabed (born 20 October 1980 in Brussels) is a Belgian-born Moroccan footballer, who plays for Luxembourg 1. Division club SC Steinfort.

Football career

Belabed signed for Scottish Premier League club Aberdeen in 1999 for a fee of £100,000. He made 40 appearances in the Scottish Premier League, scoring once against Dundee United, before leaving the club when his contract expired in 2002. He then signed for Belgian side La Louviere, who sacked him in 2004. While at La Louvière he helped them win the 2002–03 Belgian Cup.

Personal life
Belabed was born in Belgium to a Moroccan father and an Algerian mother.

In 2004, Belabed assaulted Claude Moniquet, a journalist. Belabed had accused Moniquet of being racist and an enemy of Islam.

References

External links 

1980 births
Aberdeen F.C. players
Belgian expatriate footballers
Belgian footballers
Belgian people of Algerian descent
Belgian sportspeople of Moroccan descent
Expatriate footballers in Luxembourg
Expatriate footballers in Scotland
Living people
Belgian expatriate sportspeople in Scotland
Moroccan footballers
Association football midfielders
Footballers from Brussels
R.W.D. Molenbeek players
Scottish Premier League players
R.S.C. Anderlecht players
R.A.A. Louviéroise players
Luxembourg National Division players
K.A.S. Eupen players
FC Wiltz 71 players
Racing FC Union Luxembourg players
FC RM Hamm Benfica players
Belgian Muslims
Belgian Pro League players
Challenger Pro League players